Marina Vladimirovna Sudakova (born 17 February 1989), née Yartseva, is a Russian handball player for CSM București and the Russian national team.

She is a World Champion in 2009. She is a student of the Rostov Institute of the Russian State Trade-Economic University.

References

External links

Biography on the site of "Rostov-Don"

Russian female handball players
Sportspeople from Volgograd
Living people
1989 births
Olympic medalists in handball
Olympic handball players of Russia
Olympic gold medalists for Russia
Medalists at the 2016 Summer Olympics
Handball players at the 2016 Summer Olympics